Stenocline is a genus of flowering plants in the tribe Gnaphalieae within the family Asteraceae.

 Species
 Stenocline chionaea (DC.) DC. - State of Minas Gerais in Brazil
 Stenocline ericoides DC. - Madagascar

 formerly included
several species now in Achyrocline or Helichrysum

References

Gnaphalieae
Asteraceae genera